Das Kapital is a foundational theoretical text in materialist philosophy, economics and politics written by Karl Marx.

Das Kapital may also refer to:

 DAAS Kapital (1991–1992), an Australian comedy television series starring the Doug Anthony All Stars
 Das Capital (album) (2003), an album by Luke Haines
 Das Kapital (album) (2010), an album by Capital Inicial